List of Cork senior camogie team captains features camogie players who have captained Cork in All-Ireland Senior Camogie Championship finals and National Camogie League finals.

List of Captains

Notes
  1934 captain, Kathleen Delea, is the great-aunt of 2003–04 captain, Stephanie Dunlea.
  Mary Geaney became the first player to captain a team to both the All-Ireland Senior Ladies' Football Championship and the All-Ireland Senior Camogie Championship. In 1976 she captained Kerry when they won the All-Ireland Senior Ladies' Football Championship. In 1980 she captained the Cork senior camogie team. 
  Rena Buckley was the first player to captain Cork teams to both the All-Ireland Senior Ladies' Football Championship and the All-Ireland Senior Camogie Championship. In 2012 she captained the Cork senior ladies' football team. In 2017 she captained the Cork senior camogie team.

References

 
Camogie
Cork
Cork
Cork